Meacham is an unincorporated community in Umatilla County, Oregon. It is located on the old alignment of U.S. Route 30 off Interstate 84, in the Umatilla National Forest, near Emigrant Springs State Heritage Area and the route of the Oregon Trail. It is part of the Pendleton–Hermiston Micropolitan Statistical Area.

Demographics

History
Meacham was a station on the Union Pacific Railroad, near the summit of the Blue Mountains. Major Henry A. G. Lee established a troop encampment, called Lee's Encampment, there in 1844. Meacham was named for Harvey J. and Alfred B. Meacham, who operated Meacham Station, a stage station, in the 1860s and 1870s. The first post office in the locality, established in 1862, was named "Encampment". The name was changed to "Meacham" in 1890.

On July 3, 1923, Meacham was visited by President Warren G. Harding, who stopped for the day and participated in the exercises commemorating the eightieth anniversary of the Oregon Trail, declaring it the "capital of the US for the day".  President Warren G. Harding gave a speech in Pendleton on July 4, 1923, commemorating the Oregon Trail, at which time his wife, Florence Harding was presented with a Pendleton blanket shawl in a design that became popular as the "Harding design".

Climate
Meacham has a dry-summer humid continental climate (Köppen Dsb) with cold snowy winters and mild summers.

References

Further reading

External links
Historic photos of Meacham from Salem Public Library

Oregon Trail
Pendleton–Hermiston Micropolitan Statistical Area
Unincorporated communities in Umatilla County, Oregon
1862 establishments in Oregon
Populated places established in 1862
Unincorporated communities in Oregon